Transition matrix may refer to:
 The matrix associated with a change of basis for a vector space.
 Stochastic matrix, a square matrix used to describe the transitions of a Markov chain.
 State-transition matrix, a matrix whose product with the state vector  at an initial time  gives  at a later time .